Michigan Stadium, nicknamed "The Big House," is the football stadium for the University of Michigan in Ann Arbor, Michigan. It is the largest stadium in the United States and the Western Hemisphere, the third largest stadium in the world, and the 34th largest sports venue in the world. Its official capacity is 107,601, but it has hosted crowds in excess of 115,000.

Michigan Stadium was built in 1927 at a cost of $950,000 (equivalent to $ in ) and had an original capacity of 72,000. Prior to the stadium's construction, the Wolverines played football at Ferry Field. Every home game since November 8, 1975 has drawn a crowd in excess of 100,000, an active streak of more than 300 contests. On September 7, 2013, the game between Michigan and the Notre Dame Fighting Irish attracted a crowd of 115,109, a record attendance for a college football game since 1948, and an NCAA single-game attendance record at the time, overtaking the previous record of 114,804 set two years previously for the same matchup.

Michigan Stadium was designed with footings to allow the stadium's capacity to be expanded beyond 100,000. Fielding Yost envisioned a day where 150,000 seats would be needed. To keep construction costs low at the time, the decision was made to build a smaller stadium than Yost envisioned but to include the footings for future expansion.

Michigan Stadium is used for the University of Michigan's main graduation ceremonies; President Lyndon B. Johnson outlined his Great Society program at the 1964 commencement ceremonies in the stadium. It has also hosted hockey games including the 2014 NHL Winter Classic, a regular season NHL game between the Toronto Maple Leafs and the Detroit Red Wings with an official attendance of 105,491, a record for a hockey game. Additionally, a 2014 International Champions Cup soccer match between Real Madrid and Manchester United had an attendance of 109,318, a record crowd for a soccer match in the United States.

History

Early history
Prior to playing at Michigan Stadium, Michigan played its games at Ferry Field, which at its peak could seat 40,000 people. Fielding Yost recognized the need for a larger stadium after original expansions to Ferry Field proved to be too small, and persuaded the regents to build a permanent stadium in 1926. Fashioned after the Yale Bowl, the original stadium was built with a capacity of 72,000. However, at Yost's urging, temporary bleachers were added at the top of the stadium, increasing capacity to 82,000.

On October 1, 1927, Michigan played Ohio Wesleyan in the first game at Michigan Stadium, prevailing easily, 33–0. The new stadium was then formally dedicated three weeks later in a contest against Ohio State on October 22. Michigan had spoiled the formal dedication of Ohio Stadium in Columbus five years earlier and was victorious again, besting the Buckeyes 21–0 before a standing-room-only crowd of 84,401. In 1930, electronic scoreboards were installed, making the stadium the first in the United States to use them to keep the official game time.

In 1956, the addition of a press box raised the stadium's official capacity to 101,001. The one "extra seat" in Michigan Stadium is said to be reserved for Fritz Crisler, athletic director at the time. Since then, all official Michigan Stadium capacity figures have ended in "-01", although the extra seat's location is not specified.

Before 1968, Michigan Stadium maintained a policy of "No women or children allowed on the field". Sara Krulwich, now a photojournalist for The New York Times, was the first woman on the field. Longtime radio announcer Bob Ufer dubbed Michigan Stadium "The hole that Yost dug, Crisler paid for, Canham carpeted, and Schembechler fills every cotton-pickin' Saturday afternoon". Since November 8, 1975, the stadium has held over 100,000 fans for every home game (the Indiana University contest on October 25, 1975 attracted "only" 93,857 fans).—and 24 of the 25 most attended NCAA games are at the stadium. Michigan Stadium's size is not wholly apparent from the outside as most of the seats are below ground level.

Modern era

By the mid-1980s, Michigan Stadium had become known by the nickname "The Big House". Michigan's game versus Ball State University on November 4, 2006, was the 200th consecutive crowd of over 100,000 fans. Traditionally, when the game's attendance is announced, the public address announcer (historically Howard King) thanks the fans for "being part of the largest crowd watching a football game anywhere in America today".

On September 9, 2006, attendees of Michigan's football game against the Central Michigan Chippewas endured the first weather delay in the stadium's history after lightning struck nearby during the first quarter and play was suspended for approximately one hour. On September 3, 2011, Michigan and Western Michigan mutually agreed to end their game with 1:27 left in the third quarter because of an ongoing lightning delay. It was the first time Michigan had a football game called because of lightning. The stadium was evacuated at 6:38 p.m. and the game was called shortly after 7:00.

2010 renovation and beyond

On June 21, 2007, the University's Board of Regents approved a $226 million renovation (equivalent to $ in ) and expansion project for Michigan Stadium. The project included replacement of some bleachers, widening of aisles and individual seats, installing hand rails, and the addition of a new press box, 83 luxury boxes, and 3,200 club seats. The renovation plan garnered opposition from a small number of students, alumni, and fans around the country, which waned as the renovation neared external completion.

A disabled-veterans group filed a federal lawsuit against the university on April 17, 2007, alleging that the design of the project did not meet federal standards for wheelchair-accessible seating. On March 11, 2008, as part of the settlement terms of a lawsuit filed against the university pursuant to the Americans with Disabilities Act, the university announced that the official capacity of the stadium would be reduced to accommodate additional wheelchair-accessible seating beginning with the 2009 season. The project was completed before the 2010 season.

Renovations in April 2008 caused that year's University of Michigan graduation ceremony to be moved to the Diag.

In August 2011, the University completed a six-month scoreboard replacement project; the new boards measure  each with a resolution of 900 x 1632.

Michigan Stadium was rededicated on September 4, 2010, before Michigan's first home football game of the 2010 season against the University of Connecticut, with a listed capacity of 109,901. After the renovation, the stadium lacked permanent lights, although platforms for temporary lights were included in the design. In September 2010, a few days after the rededication, the University of Michigan's Board of Regents approved a plan to add permanent lights, at a cost of $1.8 million (equivalent to $ in ). The lights were first used at the men's hockey game on December 11, 2010. The following season saw the stadium's first night football game on September 10, 2011. The Wolverines defeated the Notre Dame Fighting Irish 35–31.

The Michigan lacrosse program was elevated to NCAA varsity status in spring 2011, effective in the 2011–12 academic year. The team played most of its 2012 games in Michigan Stadium, including a match against Ohio State on April 14, 2012, after the annual Wolverine football spring game.

Seating and surface
The stadium's original capacity was 72,000, but Fielding Yost made certain to install footings that could allow for expansion over 100,000 seats. Initially, all seating consisted of wooden bleachers. These were replaced with permanent metal seating in 1949 by Fritz Crisler, athletic director at the time. From 1927 to 1968, the stadium's field was natural grass. This was replaced with 3M TartanTurf in 1969 to give players better traction. However, this surface was thought to be unforgiving on players' joints, and the stadium returned to natural grass in 1991. This too became problematic, as the field's below-surface location near the water table made it difficult for grass to permanently take root. The field was converted to FieldTurf, an artificial surface designed to give grass-like playing characteristics, in 2003. In 2010, it was upgraded with a newer version of FieldTurf called Duraspine.

Attendance records
Michigan Stadium holds the NCAA single-season average home attendance record, set in 2012 at 112,252 fans per game.

On September 7, 2013, Michigan Stadium drew a crowd of 115,109 to see Michigan defeat Notre Dame 41–30, which at the time represented a post-1948 NCAA collegiate football attendance record. Previously, and prior to NCAA record keeping for attendance, a 1927 Notre Dame–USC game at Soldier Field in Chicago drew an estimated 117,000–123,000. Both of these records fell in 2016 when Tennessee and Virginia Tech drew 156,990 for a game held at Bristol Motor Speedway, a NASCAR track with a capacity of over 150,000.

"The Big House" also holds the record for the largest attendance for an NCAA Division II football game, one involving Slippery Rock University of Pennsylvania. Back in 1959, stadium announcer Steve Filipiak thought it would be amusing to include Slippery Rock with the other football scores he read to the crowd, due to the school's unusual name. Soon, it was a tradition, and Slippery Rock became so popular with U of M fans that on September 29, 1979, "The Rock" played in-state rival Shippensburg at Michigan Stadium, in front of 61,143 fans (Shippensburg won, 45-14). Slippery Rock made repeat trips to Ann Arbor in 1981 and 2014.

With an attendance of 104,173, "The Big Chill at the Big House" set the record attendance for a hockey game. The record was broken on January 1, 2014 for the NHL's 2014 Winter Classic, where a crowd of 105,491 saw the host Detroit Red Wings fall to the Toronto Maple Leafs in a shootout.

On Saturday August 2, 2014, a sell-out crowd of 109,318 watched Manchester United defeat Real Madrid 3-1 in an International Champions Cup match. The official attendance figure was the largest for a soccer game in the United States to date, overtaking the previous record set by the 1984 Olympics Gold Medal match, when 101,799 saw France defeat Brazil 2-0 at the Rose Bowl in Pasadena, California. Michigan Stadium also holds three of the top four U.S. Soccer attendances as a crowd of 105,826 watched a 2016 International Champions Cup match on July 30, 2016 where Real Madrid defeated Chelsea 3-2 and a crowd of 101,254 watched a 2018 International Champions Cup match on July 28, 2018 where Liverpool defeated Manchester United 4-1.

Other events

Ice hockey

Association Football

Gallery

See also
 List of NCAA Division I FBS football stadiums
 List of stadiums by capacity

References

External links

 
Michigan Stadium Renovation
The Michigan Stadium Story – Bentley Historical Library, University of Michigan Athletics History

College football venues
College field hockey venues in the United States
College lacrosse venues in the United States
Michigan Wolverines football venues
University of Michigan campus
American football venues in Michigan
Ice hockey venues in Michigan
Soccer venues in Michigan
Outdoor ice hockey venues in the United States
Sports venues in Ann Arbor, Michigan
Sports venues completed in 1927
1927 establishments in Michigan